Availles-Limouzine is a commune in the west-central department of Vienne, in Nouvelle-Aquitaine.

The river Clouère flows north-westward through the western part of the commune, then forms its northwestern border. The river Vienne forms part of the commune's south-eastern border, then flows northward through the commune; the town lies on its left bank.

References

Communes of Vienne
County of La Marche